The Lawes Baronetcy, of Rothamsted in the County of Hertford, is a title in the Baronetage of the United Kingdom. It was created on 19 May 1882 for the entrepreneur and agricultural scientist John Bennet Lawes.

Lawes baronets, of Rothamsted (1882)
Sir John Bennet Lawes, 1st Baronet (1814–1899)
Sir Charles Lawes-Wittewronge, 2nd Baronet (1843–1911)
Sir John Bennet Lawes-Wittewronge, 3rd Baronet (1872–1931)
Sir John Claud Bennet Lawes, 4th Baronet (1898–1979)
Sir (John) Michael Bennet Lawes, 5th Baronet (1932–2009)

On the death of the 5th baronet, the baronetcy became extinct.

Notes

References
Kidd, Charles, Williamson, David (editors). Debrett's Peerage and Baronetage (1990 edition). New York: St Martin's Press, 1990, 

Lawes